Fon Church is a church in the village of Fon in Vestfold og Telemark county, Norway. The church is made of stone and built in the Romanesque style. It is a long church dating from the 12th century. It can accommodate 130 people.

The church has undergone major changes throughout the ages. The church's bell tower was built in 1839, and it had an older bell tower before this.
The church has a pulpit dating from 1603 and an altarpiece from 1633. There are two church bells at Fon Church; both of them were cast at the Olsen Nauen Bell Foundry in Sem. The church's oldest bell is on display at the Olsen Nauen Bell Museum. The baptismal font  was gifted to the church in 1714.

References

External links 
 Den norske kirke: Re kirkelige fellesråds. Fon kirke
 Store norske leksikon: Fon kirke
 Kirkesøk: Fon kirke
 Kulturminnesøk: Fon kirkested

Culture in Vestfold og Telemark
12th-century churches in Norway
Stone churches in Norway
Churches in Vestfold og Telemark